Roshan Khursheed Bharucha is a Pakistani politician who served as the Federal Minister for Human Rights, Kashmir Affairs and Gilgit-Baltistan, States and Frontier Regions, Railways and Postal Services in a caretaker capacity.

Education
Barucha's father migrated to Balochistan from Yazd, Iran while her mother is from Gujarat, India.

She holds a master's degree in English from the University of Balochistan and a degree in Finance and Accounting for Non-Financial Executives from PIMS Karachi which was awarded in 1993.

Political career
She has served as provincial minister of Balochistan between 2000 and 2002.

She has also served as a member of the Senate of Pakistan from 12 March 2003 to 11 March 2006.

In 2007, she was made provincial minister of Balochistan for Social Welfare, Informal education, Human rights, Youth, Information, Population, Information Technology, Manpower training, Sports, Archives, and Culture in a caretaker capacity.

In 2018, she was made Federal Minister for Human Rights, Kashmir Affairs and Gilgit-Baltistan, States and Frontier Regions, Railways and Postal Services in Mulk caretaker ministry. She is the only Parsi woman to hold federal ministries.

Personal life
She hails from Quetta and is a member of the Parsi community in Pakistan. She is a mother of three children Kaiwan, Sharaine, and Thrity.

References

Living people
Parsi people
Pakistani Zoroastrians
Members of the Senate of Pakistan
Women federal ministers of Pakistan
People from Quetta
University of Balochistan alumni
Women provincial ministers of Balochistan
Year of birth missing (living people)
Pakistani people of Iranian descent
Pakistani people of Indian descent
Pakistani people of Gujarati descent